The 1904 TCU football team represented Texas Christian University (TCU) as an independent during the 1904 college football season. Le by C. E. Cronk in his first and only year as head coach, TCU compiled a record of 1–4–1. They played their home games in Waco, Texas.

Schedule

References

TCU
TCU Horned Frogs football seasons
TCU football